Frank Pieter Israel (born 31 December 1946) is a Dutch astronomer. He received his Ph.D. in astronomy at the Leiden Observatory in 1976,
where he now is emeritus professor. Most of his work is dedicated to the Interstellar medium of external galaxies. The asteroid 7507 Israel is named for him.

Israel is chairman of the skeptical organisation Stichting Skepsis.

References

External links
 Frank Israel's home page

1946 births
Living people
20th-century Dutch astronomers
Dutch skeptics
Leiden University alumni
Academic staff of Leiden University
People from Delft